Newark Castle railway station is a Grade II listed railway station which serves the town of Newark in Nottinghamshire, England.

History

It was built in 1846 for the Midland Railway in the Italianate style. It is on the Nottingham to Lincoln Line, owned by Network Rail and managed by East Midlands Railway who provide all services. Its name comes from the nearby castle. The other station in Newark is Newark North Gate.

Station masters

Joseph Pettifor 1846 - 1848
John Gill 1848 - 1854
Edwin Alfred Pakeman 1854 - 1856
Charles Appleby ca. 1859 - 1865
Robert Michie 1865 - 1867 (formerly station master at Loughborough, afterwards station master at Leicester)
Anderson Wilcock 1868 (afterwards station master at Skipton)
B. Broadhurst 1875 - 1885 (afterwards station master at Cheltenham)
Daniel Shipp 1885 - 1895 (formerly station master at Wisbech)
Thomas A. Watford 1895 - 1911 (formerly station master at Tamworth)
William Samuel Orchard 1911 - 1927
Frank G. Sugars 1927 - 1934 (formerly station master at Pye Bridge)
George W. Ramm 1951 - 1953 (formerly station master at Dunford Bridge)
L.H. Adams 1954 - ca. 1963 (formerly station master at Swinton Town)

Facilities
The station has a ticket office on platform 1 which is staffed throughout the day, Monday-Saturday.
 At other times, tickets can be purchased from the self-service ticket machine at the station. The station has a shelter on each platform as well as modern help points for when the station is unstaffed. 

The station also has a large bicycle storage facility located next to the Nottingham bound platform as well as a large 80 space car park at its entrance.

Step-free access is available to both the platforms at Newark Castle.

Services

East Midlands Railway operate all services at Newark Castle using Class 156, 158 and 170 DMUs.

The typical off-peak service in trains per hour is:
 1 tph to  via 
 1 tph to  via Nottingham and 

The station is also served by two trains per day to and one train per day from London St Pancras International which are operated using a Class 222 Meridian. These services do not run on Sundays.

On Sundays, there is a roughly hourly service between Lincoln and Nottingham from mid-morning onwards.

Future developments
A new ticket office, waiting room and toilets facilities are due to be opened at the station in Autumn 2015.

References
References

Sources
 David Marshall Smith (1965) The industrial archaeology of the East Midlands: Nottinghamshire, Leicestershire, and the adjoining parts of Derbyshire.  Industrial archaeology of the British Isles (David & Charles) page 263

Notes

External links

Railway stations in Nottinghamshire
DfT Category F1 stations
Former Midland Railway stations
Railway stations in Great Britain opened in 1846
Railway stations served by East Midlands Railway
Grade II listed buildings in Nottinghamshire
Newark-on-Trent
1846 establishments in England
Grade II listed railway stations